Daniel Burley Woolfall (15 June 1852 – 24 October 1918) was the second president of FIFA.

An English Football Association administrator from Blackburn, Woolfall was elected as president on 4 June 1906. A key aim during his presidency was to achieve uniform football rules on an international level and he played a prominent role in the drafting of FIFA's new constitution. Under Woolfall, the application of the Laws of the Game, established under the English model, became compulsory and a clear definition was made of international matches. Two years after assuming the presidency, he helped to organise the first noteworthy international football competition, the 1908 Olympic Games in London. His tenure as president brought the arrival of FIFA's first non-European members in South Africa, Argentina, Chile and the United States but was interrupted by the outbreak of the First World War. Woolfall's presidency ended with his death in October 1918.

References

Presidents of FIFA
English footballers
People from Blackburn
1852 births
1918 deaths
Association footballers not categorized by position